Pyrinioides sinuosus is a species of moth of the family Thyrididae. It is found in Taiwan, Japan, Burma and India.

References

Moths described in 1896
Thyrididae